William Brendan Gaughan (born July 10, 1975) is an American professional racing driver who has competed in off-road and stock cars. He is the grandson of Vegas gaming pioneer Jackie Gaughan and son of Michael Gaughan, a hotel and casino magnate.

Gaughan began his career racing in off-road and he rose through the ranks from pickup trucks to the professional two-wheel-drive Trophy Truck class. In the late 1990s, he switched to pavement racing in a stock car. This led to a career in NASCAR racing. He began in the NASCAR Craftsman Truck Series, which was followed by the Busch and Cup Series during the 2000s. Gaughan competed full-time in the Xfinity Series in 2009–2010 and 2014–2017, followed by a part-time Cup schedule from 2017 to his final season in 2020.

Personal life and education
Born in Los Angeles, California but a long-term resident of Las Vegas, Nevada, Gaughan attended Georgetown University and played collegiate basketball as a walk-on for the Hoyas with friend and former Philadelphia 76ers guard Allen Iverson. He is also the brother of Las Vegas gaming executive John Gaughan.

Gaughan earned All-Conference honors as a placekicker on Georgetown's NCAA Division I-AA football team. He was primarily a role player on the basketball team whose jobs were mostly practice related but did see action in 25 games.

A unique individual, he even sported cornrows during a race at Dover International Speedway during the 2005 Craftsman Truck Series season. On August 18, 2007, he married his wife Tatum, and on October 30, 2010, Gaughan and Tatum welcomed a baby boy, who they named Michael James. His second son William was born on October 11, 2012.

In 2011, Gaughan appeared as a spokesperson for the South Point Casino in an episode of the History Channel series Only in America with Larry the Cable Guy.

In 2015, Gaughan was a guest analyst for the ARCA Racing Series race at Kentucky.

Gaughan founded City Lights Shine, a distillery, is involved in his family's South Point Casino business, and also owns New Wave Cleaning Solutions.

Racing career

Off-road career
Gaughan won his first race in a 1991 Southern Nevada Off-Road Enthusiasts (SNORE) off-road race. He was the Class 10 SNORE champion in 1991, 1992, and 1993.

In 1995, he moved to SODA (Short-course Off-road Drivers Association) series driving a Dodge Ram for the Walker Evans team. He was the 1995 Class 13 champion. He raced in premiere two-wheel-drive trophy truck Class 8 in 1996 and 1997 but did not win either championship as Scott Taylor won both championships. He moved with most SODA drivers to Championship Off-Road Racing (CORR) at the end of 1997 and raced in the Pro-2 category through 1998 where he finished third behind champion Ricky Johnson and Taylor.

His biggest wins came at Crandon International Off-Road Raceway.  His multiple wins there solidified his reputation as one of the premier off-road racers at the time with his most memorable battle coming between himself and future NASCAR champion Jimmie Johnson in 1996. The two dueled throughout the race with Johnson having to come from behind after contact with Taylor. However, Johnson's truck succumbed to crash damage from a previous incident with Jimmie Crowder and Gaughan took his first win at Crandon in a pro category. He followed the win with a repeat performance the next year at Crandon, this time piloting a Chevrolet.

In 2019, Gaughan won the Baja 1000's Class 1 category.

NASCAR career

Early career
Gaughan made his NASCAR debut in a Truck Series race in 1997 at Las Vegas Motor Speedway. Driving the No. 20 Orleans Hotel & Casino-sponsored Dodge for Walker Evans, he qualified 18th and finished 24th. He ran two races in 1998 with the No.20 team, but he failed to finish both races. He also attempted his first Busch race at Las Vegas, but he failed to qualify. In 1998, he was part of the Coca-Cola 500 at Twin Ring Motegi in Japan and was involved in a crash that also collected Bobby Hamilton.

He then decided to move to stock car racing. He ran in the Winston West Series in 1999, and was the 2000 and 2001 champion on the circuit. He attempted to qualify for a Busch Series race at Pikes Peak International Raceway in 2000, but failed to make the race. In 2001, he made his Busch Series debut at Fontana for Ed Whitaker but finished 41st. The next week, he attempted his first Winston Cup race at Las Vegas but failed to qualify. He also ran seven times in the Truck Series for Bill McAnally and TKO Motorsports, and had two top-five finishes.

2002–2004

In 2002, Gaughan and his father fielded a team for himself in the Truck Series full-time. He drove the No. 62 NAPA Auto Parts-sponsored truck to two victories on his way to the Rookie of the Year title. In 2003, he drove the No. 62 Orleans-sponsored Dodge for his father Michael, and he won six times, including twice at Texas Motor Speedway, giving him four consecutive wins at the track. He also held the points lead for most of the season, but finished 4th in points after wrecking in the last race of the season with Marty Houston, a teammate of one of Gaughan's rivals for the championship, Ted Musgrave; the collision with Marty validated Gaughan's concerns that Ultra Motorsports had entered extra trucks to serve as roadblocks to help Musgrave, as Marty was one of the extra entries.

In 2004, Gaughan moved up to the Nextel Cup Series, driving the No. 77 Eastman Kodak-sponsored Dodge for Penske-Jasper Racing. He finished second in the Rookie of the Year standings and 28th in the final points standings. He finished the season with four Top 10’s, including a career-best Top 5 finish at Talladega Superspeedway, where he had been in contention to win before Dale Earnhardt Jr. and several other drivers shuffled Gaughan back to fourth place. He did come close to a win at the Glen where he led a total of seven laps in the final 25 laps. He then spun out with 19 laps to go and then broke a transmission, finishing 34th. He was replaced at the end of the season by Travis Kvapil, after team owner Roger Penske was not satisfied with Gaughan's progress in the sport.

2005–2020

In 2005, he moved back to the Truck Series, behind the wheel of the No. 77 Dodge Ram. He finished 19th in the final points standings, with 2 top-five and 7 top-ten finishes. Starting with the September 23 race at Las Vegas Motor Speedway, the team began sporting a new livery of the South Point Casino in which his father, Michael, is the owner.

In 2007, the South Point team switched to Chevrolet Silverados, where Gaughan returned to the manufacturer which he drove during his efforts in the AutoZone West championships. In 2008, South Point Racing was to merge with Wyler Racing into Wyler-Gaughan Racing, fielding the No. 60 and No. 77 Toyotas. But the deal fell through and SPR was forced to close, leaving Gaughan and 10–12 of his crew members without a team. Gaughan signed to the drive No. 10 Ford F-150 for Circle Bar Racing in the 2008 CTS season. He had five top-tens and finished fifteenth in points.

In 2009, Gaughan drove the No. 62 Chevy for Rusty Wallace Racing in the Nationwide Series. In 2010, he rejoined RWR, but this time in a Toyota, RWR switched manufacturers at the end of 2009. He also competed in the November Phoenix Cup race for TRG Motorsports where he finished 43rd after a first-lap crash. For 2011 he returned to the Camping World Truck Series to drive the No. 62 South Point Toyota for Germain Racing while Michael Annett replaced him at RWR. However, Gaughan was unhappy with the lagging performance of the team and left the team at the end of the season. In 2012, he joined Richard Childress Racing to compete in 18 races between the Truck Series and Nationwide Series, as well as four Sprint Cup Series races in the No. 33 South Point Casino Chevrolet. Gaughan's performances in his limited opportunities were strong, posting four top 5s in 8 truck races, and five top 10s in 10 Nationwide Series races.

Gaughan returned to the Truck Series full-time in 2013, driving the No. 62 South Point Chevrolet for Childress with crew chief Shane Wilson. After 77 laps led, 10 top 5s and 13 top 10s in the 22 truck races that season, it was announced that Gaughan and Wilson would be moving up to the Nationwide Series full-time for RCR for the 2014 season.

Gaughan won his first Nationwide Series race at Road America in June 2014 after Alex Tagliani ran out of gas before the final caution. After a battle with Chase Elliott, he passed Elliott on the final lap to win the race. He was very emotional about his win as he was running a car dedicated to his deceased grandfather John Jackie Gaughan. Following the emotional win, Gaughan continued his success racing up front consistently and by winning the VisitMyrtleBeach.com 300 at Kentucky.

In 2015, Gaughan competed full-time in the Xfinity Series once again for RCR. He also drove the No. 62 Sprint Cup car for Premium Motorsports in most of the series' races without RCR support. Gaughan would not reach victory lane as he did the season before, with his best finish being runner up in California. He would finish the Xfinity season with a career-high 14 top 10s.

In the Cup Series, after a 28th-place finish to begin the season in Atlanta, Gaughan failed to qualify with Premium Motorsports at Martinsville suffering his first DNQ of the year. He then failed to qualify for five of the next six after that, and blew a tire and crashed in his only start in this period, at Talladega. He successfully qualified for the 2015 Autism Speaks 400 and again for Pocono, before suffering two more DNQs at Michigan and Sonoma. He did make the field at Daytona and finished 28th after suffering from a stuck throttle for more than half the race. Before Kentucky, he and Premium Motorsports agreed to part ways.
The 2016 season would mark Gaughan's third season in the number 62 for RCR. Gaughan, on the strength of career highs in top 5s (4), top 10s (15), and average finish (11.4), qualified for the Xfinity Series Chase. Gaughan successfully made it into the Round of 8 with two top 10s in the first 3 races. The Round of 8 began with bad luck, as Gaughan spun through the grass in the first race of the Round of 8 at Kansas, leaving him below the cut line with two races left.

After speculation about retirement, Gaughan announced he would return to RCR's No. 62 in 2017. Gaughan also announced he would run his first Daytona 500 since 2004, driving for Beard Motorsports. He finished the 500 in 11th place, earning him starts with Beard at the three remaining Cup Series restrictor-plate races.

Gaughan then had a dismal first quarter of the Xfinity season, with many mechanical failures and several instances of being swept up in accidents. Gaughan's average finish in Xfinity following Talladega was below 25th. Gaughan did return to the No. 75 Cup car at Talladega, finishing 27th. He returned to the No. 75 for the Coke Zero 400 at Daytona, where, despite being involved in a couple wrecks, was able to finish 7th. It was his first top-10 of the year, as well as his first top-10 and best Cup finish since finishing 6th at the season-ending Ford 400 at Homestead-Miami Speedway in 2004. After the 2017 Xfinity season, Gaughan announced it would be his final full season in NASCAR, though he intends to continue racing part-time for Beard at the Cup Series' superspeedways.

During the 2019 1000Bulbs.com 500 at Talladega, Gaughan ran as high as second and led for a split second before being collected in a wreck that sent his No. 62 car into a flip over Kurt Busch and Matt DiBenedetto. Gaughan finished 27th and was unharmed in the crash. On December 21, 2019, Gaughan announced that he would retire from racing after the 2020 season.

On February 9, 2020, Gaughan made the field at the Daytona 500 by posting the second fastest qualifying speed of all the non-charter teams (188.945 mph; 33rd overall). He finished 7th in the race, his best finish in the Daytona 500. Gaughan also achieved a top-ten finish at the Coke Zero Sugar 400. In his final NASCAR race, the YellaWood 500 at Talladega, he finished 35th after being collected in a Stage 2 wreck.

After his retirement, Gaughan became Beard Motorsports' vice president of racing operations.

Images

Motorsports career results

NASCAR
(key) (Bold – Pole position awarded by qualifying time. Italics – Pole position earned by points standings or practice time. * – Most laps led.)

Cup Series

Daytona 500

Xfinity Series

Camping World Truck Series

K&N Pro Series West

 Season still in progress
 Ineligible for series points

ARCA Bondo/Mar-Hyde Series
(key) (Bold – Pole position awarded by qualifying time. Italics – Pole position earned by points standings or practice time. * – Most laps led.)

Complete WeatherTech SportsCar Championship results
(key) (Races in bold indicate pole position; results in italics indicate fastest lap)

References

External links

 
 

Living people
1975 births
Sportspeople from the Las Vegas Valley
Racing drivers from Las Vegas
Racing drivers from Nevada
24 Hours of Daytona drivers
NASCAR drivers
American Le Mans Series drivers
Off-road racing drivers
Georgetown Hoyas men's basketball players
Georgetown Hoyas football players
American men's basketball players
Basketball players from Nevada
Players of American football from Nevada
WeatherTech SportsCar Championship drivers
Bishop Gorman High School alumni
Team Penske drivers
Richard Childress Racing drivers